Sokol Maliqi (Serbo-Croat: Sokol Malići; born 24 December 1981) is a football coach and former player who coaches FC Kosova. Born in SFR Yugoslavia, he represented the Switzerland U17 national team at international level.

Playing career
Maliqi was born in Pristina, SFR Yugoslavia, now Kosovo . He played as a forward.

Coaching career
Maliqi started his coaching career in April 2012 as a player-coach at FC Schwamendingen. On 15 May 2013, it was confirmed, that he would join FC Dübendorf from the upcoming season, also as a player-coach. He left the position two years later and then had a brief spell with FC Ruggell.

In the summer 2016, he joined FC Gossau ZH, still as a player-coach. He left the position at the end of 2017, to become player-coach of FC Uzwil. On 20 April 2020, it was confirmed that Maliqi had been appointed head coach of his former club, FC Kosova.

References

External links
Football.ch profile

Notes

1981 births
Living people
Swiss men's footballers
Kosovan emigrants to Switzerland
SC Cham players
FC Luzern players
FC Wil players
FC Vaduz players
Swiss expatriate footballers
Swiss expatriate sportspeople in Liechtenstein
Sportspeople from Pristina
Swiss Super League players
FC Biel-Bienne players
Expatriate footballers in Liechtenstein
Cypriot First Division players
APEP FC players
Expatriate footballers in Cyprus
SC Young Fellows Juventus players
Swiss expatriate sportspeople in Cyprus
Switzerland youth international footballers
Association football forwards
Swiss people of Albanian descent
FC Kreuzlingen players